The enzyme phosphoserine phosphatase (EC 3.1.3.3) catalyzes the reaction

O-phospho-L(or D)-serine + H2O  L(or D)-serine + phosphate

This enzyme belongs to the family of hydrolases, specifically those acting on phosphoric monoester bonds.  The systematic name is O-phosphoserine phosphohydrolase. This enzyme participates in glycine, serine and threonine metabolism.

Structural studies

References

 
 Boyer, P.D., Lardy, H. and Myrback, K. (Eds.), The Enzymes, 2nd ed., vol. 5, Academic Press, New York, 1961, p. 73-78.
 

EC 3.1.3
Enzymes of known structure